The Independent Democratic MPs (Anexartitoi Dimokratikoi Vouleftes) was a recognized parliamentary group of the Hellenic Parliament.

This parliamentary group included independent MPs originally elected with New Democracy, the Panhellenic Socialist Movement, the Coalition of the Radical Left, the Independent Greeks and the Democratic Left parties.

External links
 Hellenic Parliament - Anexartitoi Dimokratikoi Vouleftes

Hellenic Parliament
2013 establishments in Greece